William J. Derek Howes (first ¼ 1913 – death unknown) was a Welsh rugby union and professional rugby league footballer who played in the 1940s and 1950s.

Background
Derek Howes' birth was registered in Pontardawe district, Wales.

Playing career

International honours
Derek Howes won 5 caps for Wales (RL) while at Wakefield Trinity from 1948 to 1950.

Challenge Cup Final appearances
Derek Howes played right-, i.e. number 12, in Wakefield Trinity's 13–12 victory over Wigan in the 1946 Challenge Cup Final during the 1945–46 season Challenge Cup Final at Wembley Stadium, London on Saturday 4 May 1946, in front of a crowd of 54,730.

County Cup Final appearances
Derek Howes played left-, i.e. number 11, in Wakefield Trinity's 17–3 victory over Keighley in the 1951 Yorkshire County Cup Final during the 1951–52 season at Fartown Ground, Huddersfield on Saturday 27 October 1951.

Club career
Derek Howes made his début for Wakefield Trinity during November 1945, he made his début for Featherstone Rovers on  19 September 1953, he appears to have scored no drop-goals (or field-goals as they are currently known in Australasia), but prior to the 1974–75 season all goals, whether; conversions, penalties, or drop-goals, scored 2-points, consequently prior to this date drop-goals were often not explicitly documented, therefore '0' drop-goals may indicate drop-goals not recorded, rather than no drop-goals scored. In addition, prior to the 1949–50 season, the archaic field-goal was also still a valid means of scoring points.

References

External links

1913 births
Place of death missing
Year of death missing
Featherstone Rovers players
Llanelli RFC players
Rugby league players from Neath Port Talbot
Rugby league locks
Rugby league players from Swansea
Rugby league second-rows
Rugby union players from Pontardawe
Wakefield Trinity players
Wales national rugby league team players
Welsh rugby league players
Welsh rugby union players